Glenea kusamai is a species of beetle in the family Cerambycidae. It was described by Hiroshi Makihara in 1988.

References

kusamai
Beetles described in 1988